The Gair Ministry was a ministry of the Government of Queensland and was led by Labor Premier Vince Gair. It succeeded the Hanlon Ministry on 17 January 1952 following Ned Hanlon's death two days earlier. On 26 April 1957, Gair and most of the Ministry were expelled from the Labor Party and formed the Queensland Labor Party (QLP), retaining the ministry but losing the confidence of the Assembly. The ministry was followed by the Nicklin Ministry on 12 August 1957 following the defeat of both Labor and the QLP at the resulting election.

First ministry
On 17 January 1952, the Governor, Sir John Lavarack, designated 11 principal executive offices of the Government, appointed former minister Ted Walsh to the Executive Council to fill the vacancy left by Hanlon's death, and appointed the following Members of the Legislative Assembly of Queensland to the Ministry as follows. The initial form of the Ministry was almost unchanged from its predecessor.

Second ministry
On 16 March 1953, the Governor, Sir John Lavarack, designated 11 principal executive offices of the Government and appointed the following Members of the Legislative Assembly of Queensland to the Ministry as follows. No portfolios changed although the ordering did — it had the effect of promoting Jack Duggan and Ted Walsh.

Third ministry
On 28 May 1956, the Governor, Sir John Lavarack, designated 11 principal executive offices of the Government and appointed the following Members of the Legislative Assembly of Queensland to the Ministry as follows. It represented a reshuffle of the Ministry, with some portfolios being transferred and Foley being demoted. Foley left the ministry just over two weeks later following the verdict of a royal commission into land leases which found him guilty of three counts of corrupt conduct.

On 18 April 1957, the Queensland Central Executive of the Labor Party passed a vote of no confidence in Premier Gair, and on 24 April, despite having gained a unanimous vote of support from the Cabinet, he was expelled from the Labor Party. On 26 April, Gair convened a meeting of 25 MLAs, including all of the Cabinet except Deputy Premier Jack Duggan and two ex-Labor Independents, and formed the Queensland Labor Party with those present. All these were also expelled from the party. Duggan resigned from the ministry on 29 April and became leader of the Labor Party — Thomas Moores was sworn in to replace him on 7 May. On 13 June, following denial of supply in parliament, an election was called for 3 August, at which the Government and the Labor Party were defeated by the Country-Liberal coalition led by Frank Nicklin. The ministry was succeeded by the Nicklin Ministry on 12 August 1957.

Notes

References
 
 
 
 
 
 

Queensland ministries
Australian Labor Party ministries in Queensland